Hosu may refer to:

 Hōsu District, Ishikawa, a district in Japan
 Hosu (Fizeș), a river in Cluj County, Romania